Loefgrenia may refer to:

 Loefgrenia (cyanobacteria) Gomont in Wittrock et al., 1896, a genus of cynobacteria
 Loefgrenia (trematode) Travassos, 1920, a genus of trematodes, see Telorchiidae